The third tier of the Bolivian football league system consists of nine regional leagues (one for each department); the number of participants varies depending

on the department. It usually has between 8 and 12 teams. The winner and the runner-up of each league compete in the Copa Simón Bolívar, with the winner of such tournament gaining promotion to the 1st Division, and the runner-up playing a play-off match with the last two placed teams in the First Division. Until 1976, all 8 regional championships (Pando didn't have an organized tournament at the time) were the top division of the national football pyramid, with the winner of the Copa Simón Bolívar being crowned as national champion.

The oldest regional championship is the one played in La Paz. It started in 1914 and it was considered for many years as the top Bolivian league, especially when it turned into a semi-professional tournament in 1950 and started to include teams from Oruro and Cochabamba.

Copa Simón Bolívar 

The tournament started in 1960. Initially, only champions from La Paz, Cochabamba, Oruro and Santa Cruz participated. In later years, teams from other associations joined the cup, and the tournament eventually also had runners-up participating.

Until 1976, with the lack of a nationwide league, the cup determined the national champion and representative teams for the Copa Libertadores. With the creation of the Liga de Fútbol Profesional Boliviano, the Bolivian FA stopped organizing the tournament.
 
In 1989, the tournament was resurrected, with the same format of both champions and runners-up from each association, but this time each regional league was the second tier on the football pyramid so the champion was supposed to be awarded a place in the professional league. Previously, the last placed team in the 1st division was replaced by the regional champion of its department. However, that practice was kept until 1993 when finally the champion was awarded a spot in the top league.

The competition format changes frequently. In 2008, the teams were divided into three groups of six teams, to save costs. Geographically close teams were teamed up and played on a home-away round-robin basis, with group 1 consisting of teams from La Paz, Oruro and Cochabamba; group 2 of teams from Potosí, Chuquisaca and Tarija, and group 3 of teams from Santa Cruz, Beni and Pando. The top two placed teams advanced to the next round, now playing play-offs on home-away basis, the three winners and the best loser advanced to the semifinals and then the final.

Liga Nacional B

It was announced by LFPB that, due to the change of football in First Division, Copa Simon Bolivar would be replaced by Liga Nacional B which consists of thirteen clubs, the champions from each department except for Tarija which would have two clubs (Champions and runner-up), the last two relegated teams from First division and the winners of Torneo Nacional Provincial. La Paz Football Association and Oruro Football Association Championship were against this change, however the National Football Association and Bolivian Football Federation approved this change in Bolivian Football.

List of Regional Championships

Beni Football Association Championship

Chuquisaca Football Association Championship

Cochabamba Football Association Championship

La Paz Football Association Championships

1914 : The Strongest
1915 : Colegio Militar
1916 : The Strongest
1917 : The Strongest
1918-21 : No competition
1922 : The Strongest
1923 : The Strongest
1924 : The Strongest
1925 : The Strongest
1926 : No competition
1927 : Nimbles Sport
1928 : Colegio Militar
1929 : Universitario (La Paz)
1930 : The Strongest
1931 : Nimbles Sport
1932 : Bolívar
1933 : No competition
1934 : No competition
1935 : The Strongest
1936 : Ayacucho
1937 : Bolívar
1938 : The Strongest
1939 : Bolívar
1940 : Bolívar
1941 : Bolívar
1942 : Bolívar
1943 : The Strongest
1944 : Ferroviario
1945 : The Strongest
1946 : The Strongest
1947 : CD Lítoral
1948 : CD Lítoral
1949 : CD Lítoral
1950 : Bolívar
1951 : Always Ready
1952 : The Strongest
1953 : Bolívar
1954 : CD Litoral
1955 : San José
1956 : Bolívar
1957 : Always Ready
1958 : Wilstermann
1959 : Wilstermann
1960 : Wilstermann
1961 : Deportivo Municipal
1962 : Chaco Petrolero
1963 : The Strongest
1964 : The Strongest
1965 : Municipal
1966 : Bolívar
1967 : Bolívar
1968 : Always Ready
1969 : Bolívar
1970 : The Strongest
1971 : The Strongest
1972 : Litoral
1973 : Municipal
1974 : The Strongest
1975 : 31 De Octubre
1976 : Bolívar
1977 : 31 De Octubre
1978 : 31 De Octubre
1979 : No competition
1980 : Unión Maestranza
1981 : Chaco Petrolero
1982 : Mariscal Braun
1983 : Litoral
1984 : No competition
1985 : No competition
1986 : Always Ready
1987 : Chaco Petrolero
1988 : Mariscal Braun

1989 To Present

Oruro Football Association Championship

Pando Football Association Championship

Potosí Football Association Championship

Santa Cruz Football Association Championship

Tarija Football Association Championship

References

External links 
 
 http://www.actiweb.es/5cienty/8.html

 
3
Bol